Lion Fight also known as Lion Fight Promotions is an American professional Muay Thai promotion firm based in Las Vegas, Nevada. The company was established in 2010 by Scott Kent, a former casino executive. Lion Fight is currently available on UFC Fight Pass, and was previously partnered with AXS TV and broadcast on CBS Sports Network.

History 

Founded in 2010 by owner and CEO Scott Kent, Lion Fight is an active promoter of Muay Thai events. Since the promotion’s inception, it has grown to host events across 7 countries including Italy, Ireland, and Argentina and venues in the US, from the HardRock Casino to the LA Coliseum.

Controversy 
Lion Fight has been accused of multiple incidents of refusing to pay fighters for their purses, and medical expenses. Fighter Tiffany van Soest claimed the organization skipped her pay and had to sell her belt for income. In a Facebook post, Senior VP of the USMTA Paulo Tocha declared that the USMTA would no longer sanction any fights for the organization.

Notable competitors 
Notable fighters who have fought at Lion Fight events:

 Cris Cyborg
 Tetsuya Yamato
 Kevin Ross
 John Wayne Parr
 Lerdsila Chumpairtour
 Jo Nattawut
 Rungravee Sasiprapa
 Amy Pirnie

References

External links 
 Official Website
 Lion Fight | Tapology

Kickboxing organizations
Muay Thai promoters
CBS Sports
Companies based in Las Vegas